This is a list of members of the Victorian Legislative Council from the elections of 12–25 March 1874 to the elections of 15 August to 15 November 1876.

There were six Electoral Provinces and five members elected to each Province.

Note the "Term in Office" refers to that members term(s) in the Council, not necessarily for that Province.

William Mitchell was President of the Council, Caleb Jenner was Chairman of Committees.

 Hope retired in August 1874, replaced by Henry Cuthbert in a by-election the same month.
 McKellar retired around May 1875, replaced by Samuel Wilson in June 1875.
 Russell retired in March 1875, replaced by George Belcher in an April 1875 by-election.
 Strachan retired in September 1874, replaced by Thomas Bromell in by-election the same month.
 Williams died 30 December 1874, replaced by William Wilson in a January 1875 by-election

References

 Re-member (a database of all Victorian MPs since 1851). Parliament of Victoria.

Members of the Parliament of Victoria by term
19th-century Australian politicians